The 1952 Wake Forest Demon Deacons football team was an American football team that represented Wake Forest University during the 1952 college football season. In their second season under head coach Tom Rogers, the Demon Deacons compiled a 5–4–1 record and finished in a tie for second place in the Southern Conference with a 5–1 record against conference opponents.

End Jack Lewis was selected by the United Press as a first-team player on the 1952 All-Southern Conference football team.

Schedule

Team leaders

References

Wake Forest
Wake Forest Demon Deacons football seasons
Wake Forest Demon Deacons football